This is a list of regions of Somalia by the Human Development Index, as of 2021.

See also 
 List of countries by Human Development Index

References 

Somalia
Somalia